Michael Kramer is an American audiobook narrator. Kramer has recorded over a hundred audiobooks for trade publishers and has participated in the Library of Congress's Talking Books program.

Reception and awards
Kramer has received praise for his narrations, with the Library Journal stating that Kramer reads "clearly and intensely".

Awards
AudioFile Earphones Award
Torgi Award

Personal life
Kramer lives in Washington, D.C. area with his wife, Jennifer Mendenhall (aka Kate Reading), and their two children. Kramer and Reading have co-narrated audiobooks. Kramer also works as an actor in the local theater, including The Kennedy Center’s production of The Light of Excalibur.

Bibliography

As narrator

The Day After Tomorrow (1994)
Homeland (1994)
Closing Time (1995)
Colin Powell: Soldier/Statesman- Statesman/Soldier (1995)
Galatea 2.2 (1995)
In the Big Country (1995)
Tom Clancy's Op-Center - 12 Books (1995-2005)Capone: The Man and the Era Part I (1996)Zen and The Art of Motorcycle Maintenance (1997)The Hot Rock (1998)Comeback (1999)All on Fire (2001)Best of Mysteries (2001)Burn Factor (2001)The Dame (2001)Bad News (2002)The Black Bird (2002)Butcher's Moon (2002)Cheyenne Raiders (2002)Day of Confession (2002)Deadly Edge (2002)Firebreak (2002)The Good German (2002)Heaven and Hell (2002)The Jugger (2002)The Call of the Wild (2003)Crossroads of Twilight (2003)Fatal (2003)Jennifer Government (2003)New Spring (2004)The Eye of the World (2004)The Great Hunt (2004)Choice Cuts (2005)The Dragon Reborn (2005)The Shadow Rising (2005)The Fires of Heaven (2005)Lord of Chaos (2005)The Inner Circle (2005)Broken Windows, Broken Business (2006)Heat (2006)Knife of Dreams (2006)Triptych (2006)The Attributes of God (2007)A Crown of Swords (2007)The Enemy at Home (2007)The Gettysburg Gospel (2007)Last Flag Down (2007)The Devil You Know (2008)Fidelity (2008)Gomorrah (2008)Mistborn: The Hero of Ages (2008)The Path of Daggers (2008)Chasing Daylight (2009)A Darkness Forged in Fire (2009)Death Benefits (2009)The Gathering Storm (2009)Mistborn: The Final Empire (2009)Mistborn: The Well of Ascension (2009)Great Lives: Joseph (2009)Dead Aim (2010)Galveston (2010)Great Lives: David (2010)The Untold Story of the New Testament (2010)The Way of Kings (2010)Towers of Midnight (2010)How to Disappear: Erase Your Digital Footprint, Leave False Trails, and Vanish Without a Trace (2010)Mistborn: The Alloy of Law (2011)The Dinosaur Hunter (2011)The Informant (2011)The Gambler (2011)Winter's Heart (2011)Desert Solitaire (2012)The Escape Artists (2012)Ice Fire (2012)A Memory of Light (2013)Words of Radiance (2014)Circle of Reign (2014)Astoria (2014)The Shadow of What Was Lost (2015)The Grace of Kings (2015)Chaos Theory (2015)Mistborn: Shadows of Self (2015)A Gathering of Shadows (2016)Conspiracy Theory (2016)Conversion Theory (2016)Mistborn: The Bands of Mourning (2016)Arcanum Unbounded: The Cosmere Collection (2016)Never Split the Difference: Negotiating as if Your Life Depended on It (2016)A Conjuring of Light (2017)Graveyard Shift (2017)An Echo of Things to Come (2017)Oathbringer (2017)Kiss the Girls (2018) Audible Book (1995)Shadow of the Conqueror Chronicles of Everfall Book 1 (2019)The Light of All That Falls (2019)Rhythm of War (2020)Breach of Peace (2021)Mistborn: The Lost Metal (2022)Tress of the Emerald Sea'' (2023)

References

External links
Author profile on AudioFile

Living people
Audiobook narrators
Year of birth missing (living people)